Vittoria S.p.A. is an Italian bicycle tire manufacturer established in 1953.  The company has more than 1000 employees around the world, produces 5 million road and mountain bike tires

Locations

In 2020, headquarters were moved back to Italy (Brembate) as a private equity fund from Milan bought the company from its previous Dutch owners.

Vittoria facilities around the world include:
 Vittoria S.p.A., in Brembate, Italy
 Vittoria Industries North America Inc., in Oklahoma City, OK, USA
 Vittoria Industries North America Inc., in Salem, MA, USA
 Lion Tyres (Thailand) Co., Ltd., in Bangkok, Thailand
 Vittoria Industries Ltd., in Hong Kong
 Vittoria Logistics Taiwan, in Taipei, Taiwan
 Vittoria Internazionale Ltd. Taiwan Branch, in Taichung, Taiwan

See also

 List of bicycle parts
 List of Italian companies

References

External links

 Vittoria Corporate Website

Tire manufacturers of Italy
Cycle parts manufacturers
Wheel manufacturers
Italian brands
Manufacturing companies established in 1953
Italian companies established in 1953
Companies based in Lombardy
Multinational companies headquartered in Italy